is a former Japanese football player.

Playing career
Sakurai was born in Ibaraki Prefecture on June 29, 1979. After graduating from Komazawa University, he joined J2 League club Montedio Yamagata in 2002. He became a regular goalkeeper in 2003. However he lost his position behind Kenta Shimizu in 2006. In 2007, he moved to J1 League club Ventforet Kofu. However he could hardly play in the match behind Kensaku Abe and Tatsuya Tsuruta and Ventforet was relegated to J2 end of 2007 season. In 2008, he became a regular goalkeeper. In 2009, he moved to J2 club Vegalta Sendai. Although Vegalta was promoted to J1 end of 2010 season, he could hardly play in the match behind Takuto Hayashi and Kentaro Seki until 2014. In 2015, he moved to J2 club Tochigi SC. He played many matches while battling with Akihiko Takeshige for the position. However Tochigi finished at the bottom place in 2015 season and was relegated to J3 League. He retired end of 2015 season.

Club statistics

References

External links

1979 births
Living people
Komazawa University alumni
Association football people from Ibaraki Prefecture
Japanese footballers
J1 League players
J2 League players
Montedio Yamagata players
Ventforet Kofu players
Vegalta Sendai players
Tochigi SC players
Association football goalkeepers